This article details the qualifying phase for weightlifting at the 2024 Summer Olympics. The competition at these Games comprises a total of 120 weightlifters coming from different nations; each is permitted to enter a maximum of three weightlifters per gender, and a maximum of one per weight category.

Qualification system
Each of the ten bodyweight categories consists of twelve weightlifters coming from different NOCs. These qualification spots are distributed to the following criteria below:
 IWF Olympic Qualification Ranking (as of April 28, 2024) – The ten highest-ranked weightlifters (by name and NOC) will obtain a quota place for their respective NOC and bodyweight category through the biennial IWF Olympic Qualification Ranking list (running from August 1, 2022, to April 28, 2024). If a weightlifter ranks in the top ten of the OQR for more than one weight category, the NOC involved must declare to the IWF which weightlifting event will he or she compete at the Games by May 10, 2024. If the NOC contains more than three athletes per gender across different weight categories in the top 10 of the OQR, the NOC must declare to the IWF which athletes they decide will be allocated the Olympic quota places.
 IWF Olympic Continental Qualification Ranking (as of April 28, 2024) – To achieve the widest possible representation across the IWF-recognized continental federations (Africa, the Americas, Asia, Europe, and Oceania), a single quota place is distributed to the highest-ranked eligible weightlifter, representing the NOC whose continent lies outside the top ten of his or her respective bodyweight category.
 Host nation – As the host country, France reserves two men's and two women's quota places across the different bodyweight categories. If less than two French weightlifters, whether male or female, qualify regularly and directly through the OQR, they may add more eligible athletes of their choice to attain the maximum guaranteed quota places, respecting the three-member limit per NOC.
 Universality places – Six invitational places (three per gender) will be entitled to eligible NOCs interested to have their weightlifters compete in Paris 2024 as granted by the Universality principle.

The quota places obtained by the ranking list (including continental places) and the Tripartite Commission (or Universality Invitation) are awarded to the specific weightlifter by name.  Those for the host nation are distributed to the NOC which could allocate them among the various weight classes. If French weightlifters qualify through the ranking list, the number of host nation places would decrease (that is, the host places would only be used if France enters fewer than three men and three women, and only so many as needed to bring France up to those numbers would be used). Unused host places would be awarded through the IWF Olympic Qualification Ranking list.

To be eligible for Paris 2024, all weightlifters must compete at the 2023 IWF World Championships in Riyadh, Saudi Arabia, at the 2024 IWF World Cup in Phuket, Thailand, and in three or more qualifying tournaments as listed in the timeline section. Apart from two compulsory events, the host country France and those eligible for the Universality invitational places may compete in a minimum of two qualifying tournaments.

Each NOC is permitted to enter one weightlifter per bodyweight category and three per gender across all weight classes. The maximum number of athletes per NOC across all weight classes could also be limited because of the consequences wreaked by the anti-doping violations. Breaching an obligation under the IWF Anti-Doping Rule, failing to comply with any directives or requests on anti-doping matters issued by IWF, or committing three or more anti-doping violations sanctioned by IWF throughout the qualification calendar would forfeit some or all quota places obtained by any NOC at the Games.

Timeline

Qualification summary

Men's events

61 kg

73 kg

89 kg

102 kg

+102 kg

Women's events

49 kg

59 kg

71 kg

81 kg

+81 kg

References

Qualification for the 2024 Summer Olympics
Qualification